The Chapultepec splitfin (Girardinichthys viviparus), known locally as mexcalpique, is a critically endangered species of fish in the family Goodeidae. It is endemic to Mexico and was originally restricted to lakes and wetlands in the Valley of Mexico, including Lake Texcoco. Through man-made channels it was able to spread to the upper Pánuco River basin (notably Tula River and associated reservoirs). Most native populations disappeared as they were at or near Mexico City, with the waters either being reclaimed, drained, heavily polluted or infested with introduced species. Today the Chapultepec splitfin is only known to survive in three lakes (Viejo, Menor and Mayor) in the Chapultepec park of Mexico City, Lake Xochimilco, Lake Zumpango, Laguna de Tecocomulco northeast of the City where perhaps introduced, and parts of the Pánuco River basin. Most of these remaining populations are small. This species was originally described as Cyprinus viviparus in 1837 by Miguel Bustamante y Septién with the type locality given as "Mexico". In 1860 Pieter Bleeker raised the genus Girardinichthys with a new species Girardinichthys viviparus as its type species, this subsequently proved to be a taxonomy of Cyprinus viviparus.

References

Girardinichthys
Freshwater fish of Mexico
Fish described in 1837
Taxonomy articles created by Polbot